Extractivism is the removal of natural resources particularly for export with minimal processing. This economic model is common throughout the Global South. The concept was coined in Portuguese as "extractivismo" in 1996 to describe the for-profit exploitation of forest resources in Brazil. Despite increased popularity of the term in the 2010s some scholars have put into question the novelty of concept and its associated discourse claiming it be can be equated to a continuation of Galeano's Open Veins of Latin America (1971).

Many actors are involved in the process of extractivism. These include but are not limited to community members, transnational corporations (TNCs) and the government. Trends have demonstrated that countries do not often extract their own resources; extraction is often led from abroad. These interactions have contributed to extractivism being rooted in the hegemonic order of global capitalism. Extractivism is controversial because it exists at the intersection where economic growth and environmental protection meet. This intersection is known as the green economy. Extractivism has evolved in the wake of neo-liberal economic transitions to become a potential avenue for development to occur. This development occurs through stabilizing growth rates and increasing direct foreign investment.

However, while these short-term economic benefits can be substantial, extractivism as a development model is often critiqued for failing to deliver the improved living conditions it promises and failing to work collaboratively with already existing programs, therefore inflicting environmental, social and political consequences. According to economists Andrea Cori and Salvatore Monni extractivism perpetuates a resource curse, a phenomenon that causes countries rich in natural resources to have slow economic growth, low development, corrupt governments and unequal distribution of wealth, since the wealth produced with the resource is exported to other countries or oligopolic companies, which use a part of the wealth generated to bribe local governments to increase extractivism, creating a positive feedback for unequal wealth distribution.

Environmental concerns of extractivism include; climate change, soil depletion, deforestation, loss of food sovereignty, declining biodiversity and contamination of freshwater. Social and political implications include violation of human rights, unsafe labour conditions, unequal wealth distribution and conflict. As a result of this, extractivism remains a prominent debate in policy related discourse because while it sometimes delivers high economic gains in the short term, it also poses social and environmental dangers. Case studies in Latin America demonstrate these policy gaps.

Background

Definition 
Extractivism is the removal of large quantities of raw or natural materials, particularly for export with minimal processing. The concept emerged in the late 1900s (as extractivismo) to describe resource appropriation for export in Latin America. Scholarly work on extractivism has since applied the concept to other geographical areas and also to more abstract forms of extraction such as the digital and intellectual realms or to finance. Regardless of its range of application, the concept of extractivism may be essentially conceived as "a particular way of thinking and the properties and practices organized towards the goal of maximizing benefit through extraction, which brings in its wake violence and destruction".

Neo-extractivism 
Extractivism has been promoted as a potential development path in which raw materials are exported and revenues are used to improve people's living conditions. This approach is called “neo-extractivism”. This transition to neo-liberal economies is rooted in a nation’s subordination to an emphasis on free trade. In contrast to older forms of extractivism, neo-extractivism regulates the allotment of resources and their revenue, pushes state-ownership of companies and raw materials, revises contracts, and raises export duties and taxes. The success of neo-extractivism is debatable as the communities at the sites of extraction rarely experience improved living conditions. More commonly, the people at these sites experience worsened living conditions, such as in the cases of extraction from Indigenous communities in Canada’s boreal forest. Neo-extractivism has similarities to older forms of extractivism and exists in the realm of neo-colonialism.

History 
Extractivism has been occurring for over 500 years. During colonization, large quantities of natural resources were exported from colonies in Africa, Asia and the Americas to meet the demands of metropolitan centres.

Philosophy 
Extractivism is a result of colonial thought which places humans above other life forms. It is rooted in the belief that taking from the earth will create abundance. Many Indigenous scholars argue that extractivism opposes their philosophy of living in balance with the earth and other life forms in order to create abundance. Leanne Betasamosake Simpson, a Michi Saagiig Nishnaabeg scholar and writer, compares these ideas of destruction versus regeneration in her book A Short History of the Blockade. She references the Trent Severn Waterway, a dam in Canada that caused major loss of fish, a major source of food for her people. She quotes Freda Huson in saying, “Our people’s belief is that we are part of the land. The land is not separate from us. The land sustains us. And if we don’t take care of her, she won’t be able to sustain us, and we as a generation of people will die.” She also defines extractivism in another work, stating it is “stealing. It’s taking something, whether it’s a process, an object, a gift, or a person, out of the relationships that give it meaning, and placing it in a nonrelational context for the purposes of accumulation.” The colonial action of theft goes beyond only extracting from the earth. This philosophy of entitlement is the cause behind colonization itself, and we are watching the continuation of theft in real-time through practices such as extractivism. Naomi Klein also touches on this in her book "This Changes Everything: Capitalism vs. The Climate." She writes, "Extractivism ran rampant under colonialism because relating to the world as a frontier of conquest- rather than a home- fosters this particular brand of irresponsibility. The colonial mind nurtures the belief that there is always somewhere else to go to and exploit once the current site of extraction has been exhausted."

Actors 
Transnational corporations (TNCs) are a primary actor in neo-extractivism. Originally, as TNCs began to explore raw material extraction in developing countries they were applauded for taking a risk to extract high-demand resources. TNCs were able to navigate their way into a position where they maintained large amounts of control over various extraction-based industries. This success is credited to the oftentimes weak governance structure of the resource dependent economies where extraction is taking place. Through complex arrangements and agreements, resources have slowly become denationalized. As a result of this, the government has taken a “hands-off” approach, awarding most of the control over resource enclaves and the social responsibility that accompanies them to TNCs. However, the government still plays an important role in leading development by determining which TNCs they allow to extract their resources and how thorough they are when it comes to enforcing certain standards of social responsibility.

Resources and techniques 
Some resources that are obtained through extraction include but are not limited to gold, diamonds, oil, lumber and food. This occurs through techniques such as mining, drilling and deforestation. Resources are typically extracted from developing countries as a raw material. This means that it has not been processed or has been processed only slightly. These materials then travel elsewhere to be turned into goods that are for sale on the world market. An example of this would be gold that is mined as a raw mineral and later in the supply chain manufactured into jewellery.

Impacts of extractivism

Economic benefits 
Neo-extractivism is seen as an opportunity for successful development in many areas of the developing world. Demand for extracted resources on the global market has allowed this industry to expand. Since the year 2000, there has been a substantial rise in global demand and value for raw materials – this has contributed to steadily high prices. Neo-extractivism has therefore been seen as a tool for economically advancing developing countries that are rich in natural resources by participating in this market.

It is argued that the emergence of this industry in the neo-liberal context has allowed extractivism to contribute to stabilizing growth rates, increasing direct foreign investment, diversifying local economies, expanding the middle class and reducing poverty. This is done by using surplus revenue to invest in development projects such as expanding social programs and infrastructure. Overall, extraction based economies are seen as long-term development projects that guarantee a robust economic foundation. It has created a new hegemonic order that closely intertwines with the dominant capitalist system of the world. The green economy has emerged as an economic model in response to the arising tensions between the economy and the environment. Extractivism is one of the many issues that exist at this intersection between the economy and the environment.

Increasingly, policy tools such as corporate social responsibility mechanisms and increased government involvement are being used to mitigate the negative implications of neo-extractivism and make it a more effective development model.

Environmental consequences 
One of the main consequences of extractivism is the toll that it takes on the natural environment. Due to the scale extraction takes place on; several renewable resources are becoming non-renewable. This means that the environment is incapable of renewing its resources as quickly as the rate they are extracted at. It is often falsely assumed that technological advancements will enable resources to renew more effectively and as a result make raw material extraction more sustainable. The environment often must compensate for overproduction driven by high demand. Global climate change, soil depletion, loss of biodiversity and contamination of fresh water are some of the environmental issues that extractivism contributes to. As well, extraction produces large amounts of waste such as toxic chemicals and heavy metals that are difficult to dispose of properly.  To what degree humans have a right to take from the environment for developmental purposes is a topic that continues to be debated.

Social impacts 
In addition to the environmental consequences of extractivism, social impacts arise as well. Local communities are often opposed to extractivism occurring. This is because it often uproots the communities or cause environmental impacts that will affect their quality of life. Indigenous communities tend to be particularly susceptible to the social impacts of extractivism. Indigenous peoples rely on their environment to sustain their lifestyles as well as connect with the land in spiritual ways. Extractivist policies and practices heavily destroy the land as explained above. This changes game populations, migration patterns for animals, pollutes rivers and much more. Doing so, does not allow Indigenous populations to practice their culture and ways of life because the environment they depend on to hunt, fish etc. is drastically changed. In addition, this destruction hinders the practice of Indigenous culture and creation of knowledge making it more difficult for Indigenous individuals to pass down their traditions to future generations.

While employment opportunities are brought to local communities as a pillar of neo-extractivism projects, the conditions are often unsafe for workers. TNCs can take advantage of more lenient health and safety conditions in developing countries and pay inadequate wages in order to maximize their profits. As well, foreigners usually fill the highest paying managerial positions, leaving local community members to do the most labour intensive jobs. Frequently, the enclaves where extractivism occurs are distanced from government involvement, therefore allowing them to avoid being subjected to the enforcement of national laws to protect citizens. This can result in widespread human rights violations. It is argued that prolonged social transformation cannot thrive on export dependent extractivism alone therefore making neo-extractivism a potentially flawed development method on its own.

Political implications 

Due to the fact that the state is a prominent actor in the extractivism process it has several political implications. It pushes the state into a position where they are one of the central actors involved in development when recent decades have seen a shift to civil society organizations. As well, the relationship between the State providing the natural resources and the TNCs extracting them can be politically complex sometimes leading to corruption. Likewise, as a result of government involvement, this process as a development project becomes politicized. The increasing demand for raw materials also increases the likelihood of conflict breaking out over natural resources.

Extractivism near or on Indigenous land without the permission of Indigenous peoples begins to threaten the land based self-determination of Indigenous groups. Conflicts between Indigenous peoples, corporations and governments are occurring around the world. Because many of the extractivist practices take place where Indigenous communities are located, the conflicts are making these landscapes politicized and contested. The conflicts are driven because Indigenous lives are put in jeopardy when they are dispossessed, when they lose their livelihoods, when their water and land is polluted and the environment is commodified.

Anti-extractivist activism 

Because extractivism so often has negative implications for the Indigenous communities it affects, there is much resistance and activism on their end. For example, from the 1980s and through today we can see examples of “extrACTIVISM”, a term coined by author Anna J. Willow. In protest of the logging project on their land, the Penan of Borean Malaysia claimed it was a case of civil disobedience as a means to end it and succeeded. In ‘89, Kayapó peoples stood up against the building of dams on their land in Pará, Brazil, causing their funding to be stopped and successfully ending the project. The U’wa people of Colombia ended oil extraction on their land through blockade activism from the 90s through 2000. Just this year, the Keystone Pipeline that runs through Canada and the U.S. was put to a halt due to Indigenous activism. Its construction officially ended in June of 2021. Despite the difficulties they face in protesting these projects, their resilience continues to flourish and oftentimes they succeed in ending extractivism on their land. Another example of this activism is the Ponca tribe planting corn in the path of the Keystone Pipeline as an act of resistance. Aside from active protesting, Tribal sovereignty is essential in their goal of protecting their own land.

Case studies

Yanacocha gold mine 

The Yanacocha gold mine in Cajamarca, Peru is an extractivist project. In 2011, a TNC began the project. The government favoured this project and saw it as an opportunity for development therefore giving large amounts of control to the TNCs extractive procedures. Local communities expressed concerns about water contamination. Leaders of Yanacocha promised the creation of 7,000 jobs and development projects that would be beneficial for the community. The TNC said they would abandon the project if they could not do so on socially and economically responsible terms. However, this guarantee failed to be actualized and violent conflict broke out as a result. Regional and national governments had opposing opinions on the project and protests broke out injuring more than 20 people and killing five. The regional government sided with the community protestors, rejecting the Cajamarca mining project, but in the end, the national government overrode the concerns of the community and pushed the mine forward, leaving the task of social responsibility to the corporations.

Ecuador: oil exploitation in Yasuni National Park 

Many Amazonian communities in Ecuador are opposed to the national governments endorsement of oil extraction in Yasuni National Park. The Spanish corporation Repsol S.A. and American corporation Chevron-Texaco have both attempted to make investments to extract oil from the reserves in Yasuni. Various civil society organizations fought against the implementation of this project because of the parks valuable biodiversity and their concerns were answered. The Ecuadorian state worked collaboratively with these interest groups and launched a project where members of the international community could donate to a fund that was put in place to compensate for the lost income that an oil reserve would have generated. This totalled US$3.5 billion, equal to 50% of the revenue that would have been produced by the oil extraction project. Through this initiative, the wishes of the activists and community members were validated without compensating economic growth. Since then, the national government has taken these concerns even further, redesigning the constitution to give the state more autonomy over their natural and raw materials. In addition, an overall mandate of living well has been adopted for guiding neo-extractivism projects in the future.

References

Bibliography 

 Acosta, Alberto. “Extractivism and neo-extractivism: two sides of the same curse.”Beyond Development: Alternative Visions From Latin America, (2013): 61–87.
 
 
 
 
 
 
 
 
 

Natural resources